Újezdeček (until 1948 Malý Újezd) is a municipality and village in Teplice District in the Ústí nad Labem Region of the Czech Republic. It has about 900 inhabitants.

References

Villages in Teplice District